Not 4 Sale or Not for Sale may refer to:

Music
Not For Sale (mixtape)
Not 4 Sale (Sammy Hagar album), 2002 hard rock
Not 4 Sale (Kardinal Offishall album), 2008 Canadian hip hop
"Not for Sale", song by Ruslana 2008
"Not for Sale", song by Ernie Smith (singer)	1969
"Not for Sale", song by Ken Boothe	1973
"Not 4 Sale", song by JSSS 2021

Other
Not for Sale (film), a 1924 silent film
"Not For Sale", a poem by Patience Strong